The PSLV-C51 is the 53rd mission of the Indian Polar Satellite Launch Vehicle (PSLV) program. The Polar Satellite Launch Vehicle (PSLV)-C51 was launched at 04:54 (UTC) / 10:24 (IST) on 28 February 2021 with the main payload from Brazil, INPE's Amazônia-1 and 18 other ride-sharing small satellites.
This is the first dedicated commercial launch executed by NSIL.

Details
The PSLV-C51 was launched from the First Launch Pad of the Satish Dhawan Space Centre in Sriharikota, Andhra Pradesh,India. The PSLV C51 rocket carried primary payload, Amazônia-1 and 18 secondary payloads like SDSat and three UnitySats(JITsat, GHRCEsat, Sri Shakthi Sat) etc.

It was the third flight of PSLV-DL, having 2 strap-on boosters and placed the payloads in sun-synchronous orbits.

Private sector company Ananth Technologies worked with ISRO on the PSLV-C51 mission. The company conducted stage integration and checkout on the mission, marking the first time that ISRO had contracted a private sector company to undertake the task.

Launch schedule
The launch was originally scheduled for 22 February 2021, but was delayed to 28 February owing to delays in assembly of the rocket.

Mission overview
 Propellant:
Stage 1: Composite Solid
 Stage 2: Earth Storable Liquid 
 Stage 3: Composite Solid 
 Stage 4: Earth Storable Liquid
 Altitude: 

The PSLV C51 rocket has four stages; each one was self-contained, with its own propulsion system, thereby capable of functioning independently. The first and third stages used composite solid propellants, while the second and fourth stage use earth-storable liquid propellant.

References

External links

Polar Satellite Launch Vehicle
Spacecraft launched by India in 2021
February 2021 events in India
Rocket launches in 2021